Mother Up! is an adult animated television series starring Eva Longoria, that streamed on Hulu in the United States and aired on City in Canada for a single season from 2013 to 2014. The show chronicles the misguided attempts at parenthood of a disgraced music executive who transitions from the big city to suburbia. After she resigns from her job and her husband leaves her, Rudi Wilson becomes a single mother raising her two children, Apple and Dick, and must learn mothering duties. Longoria stars as the main character and serves as executive producer.

Mother Up! premiered on November 6, 2013, with new episodes released on Wednesdays. It made its Canadian television debut on City on January 23, 2014, with new episodes aired on Saturday nights (during its first few weeks it was Thursday nights). The show was developed by Rogers Media and co-produced by Canadian companies Breakthrough Entertainment and Bardel Entertainment, in association with U.S.-based Mass Animation.  The show marked Hulu's second foray into animated programming after The Awesomes. It was pitched as "Family Guy for women".

The Mother Up! theme song, is written and performed by Lee Anna James in the Hulu release.

The series became available on Breakthrough Entertainment's YouTube channel in mid-2020.

Characters

Wilson family
Rudi Wilson (voiced by Eva Longoria) - The main character, a former music executive whose reputation is almost ruined after a scandal involving shooting kids in Central America with her client, 2Bit. She preserves her reputation by transferring all of the blame to her boss, at the price of her job and her life in the city. Now, she must live as a single suburban mother (her husband left her with two kids), despite being a terrible one.
Dick Wilson (voiced by Jesse Camacho) - Rudi's son, a loner, whose only friend is Agnes Chu. He constantly gets bullied by Travis. In episode 1, Rudi throws him a 10th birthday party, although Sarah says Dick and Apple's birthdays aren't for months, so Dick is probably 9 years old during the first season.
Apple Wilson (voiced by Rebecca Husain) - Rudi's imaginative daughter, who longs for her mother's attention. In episode 4, Rudi says Apple is 6, while in episode 6 says is 5. 
Jeffrey Wilson (voiced by Mark McKinney) - Rudi's former husband, and the father of Dick and Apple.

Chu family
Mrs. Suzi Chu (voiced by Grace Lynn Kung) - One of the series' other antagonists; Jenny's friend. She drives her daughter Agnes to excessive studying.
Agnes Chu (voiced by Rebecca Husain) - A girl in Dick's grade, but she's in the gifted class. She attends sports camp every summer as her parents want her to be well-rounded. In episode 6, her mother says she is the youngest female Chess Master in the world (though Apple, enhanced by drugs, checkmates her) and Rudi estimates that Agnes is 10 years old.

Neighbours
Sarah (voiced by Gabrielle Miller) - Rudi's friend and neighbor, a married mother of one. Sarah is very impressed by Rudi's high-powered lifestyle and celebrity friends, and is easily convinced to "pick up the slack" in Rudi's parenting. Rudi plainly takes advantage of Sarah's good nature, but she takes the abuse like a trooper in the name of friendship and for the good of Apple and Dick. In her heart, she admires Rudi's life and attitude.
Fergus (voiced by Rebecca Husain) - Sarah's autistic son (she calls him "Fergie"); Apple's friend.
Greg (voiced by Scott McCord) - Rudi's friend and other neighbor, a widowed father of one. Greg sees himself as a helper and potential suitor to Rudi, though she walks all over him. However, his eternal optimism fuels their friendship. He likes to do odd jobs for her and the community; it also implied Greg is scared of his stepson Joel.
Joel (voiced by Zachary Bennett) - Greg's stepson. He hates adults, especially his stepdad Greg, perhaps because he misses his real dad. His mother died, so Greg inherited custody of him. Joel is a misanthropic goth/emo with extremely violent and anti-social tendencies, in sharp contrast to his easy-going, gregarious stepfather. He plays violent video games - only banned ones - while also wearing diapers so he can play for long periods of time.

Faculty
Principal Moxley (voiced by Helen Taylor) - Head of staff at the kids' school. In Episode 6, she threatens to call Child Protective Services because Rudi let Apple walk across the tightrope on school grounds, but backs down after Rudi says she will tell the police, the media, and the school's insurance company about the tightrope.
Nurse Higgins (voiced by Rebecca Husain) - The school's nurse and head of the drama department. She enjoys explaining diagnoses and stories in a theatrical manner, with costumes.
Miss Belfonte (voiced by Gabrielle Miller) - Apple's teacher.
Ernesto - The school janitor; Miss Belfonte often hits on him.

Others
Jenny (voiced by Helen Taylor) - Rudi's enemy and one of the series' antagonists. She disapproves of Rudi's parenting, and is resentful that Rudi is the only person who ever stood up to her. Her child attends the same school as Dick and Apple.
Travis (voiced by Scott McCord) - Son of one of Jenny's friends; a school bully who beats up Dick.
2Bit (voiced by Clé Bennett) - A rapper; Rudi's former client, he constantly needs Rudi's help when he needs inspiration or if he's too full of himself, so he visits her often. To sign him with Mass Exploitation Records, Rudi went child-hunting with him, which is why she had to move to the suburbs.

Episodes

References

External links
 Mother Up! at Hulu
 
 Mother Up! at Rotten Tomatoes

2010s American adult animated television series
2010s Canadian adult animated television series
2010s American animated comedy television series
2010s Canadian animated comedy television series
2013 American television series debuts
2013 Canadian television series debuts
2014 American television series endings
2014 Canadian television series endings
American adult animated comedy television series
Canadian adult animated comedy television series
English-language television shows
Citytv original programming
Hulu original programming
Television series by Broadway Video
Animated television series about children
Animated television series about families